Mirko Cudini (born 1 September 1973) is an Italian professional football coach and a former player, most recently in charge of Fidelis Andria.

Club career
He played three seasons (36 games, 1 goal) in the Serie A for Torino and Ascoli.

In January 2007, he left for Serie B club Vicenza. In exchange, Ascoli signed Leandro Vitiello in co-ownership deal.

In 2008–09 season he left for Prima Divisione club Perugia. In July 2009 he left for Monza.

Coaching career
On 5 July 2019 he was appointed head coach of Serie D club Campobasso. He guided Campobasso to promotion in the 2020–21 Serie D, and was confirmed in charge of the Rossoblu also for the club's comeback season to Serie C.

After guiding Campobasso to safety in their 2021–22 Serie C campaign, on 30 April 2022 Cudini announced his departure from the Rossoblu. On 15 June 2022, Cudini was unveiled as the new head coach of Serie C club Fidelis Andria. On 1 November 2022, following a string of negative results that left Fidelis Andria deep into relegation zone, both Cudini and sporting director Sandro Federico were dismissed from their respective roles.

Honours

Coach
 Campobasso
 Serie D: 2020–21 (Girone F)

References

External links
 

Italian footballers
Serie A players
Serie B players
Serie C players
A.S. Sambenedettese players
U.S. Avellino 1912 players
U.S. Salernitana 1919 players
Torino F.C. players
Cagliari Calcio players
Genoa C.F.C. players
Ascoli Calcio 1898 F.C. players
L.R. Vicenza players
A.C. Perugia Calcio players
A.C. Monza players
Fermana F.C. players
Sportspeople from the Province of Fermo
1973 births
Living people
Association football defenders
Italian football managers
Footballers from Marche
People from Sant'Elpidio a Mare